Marcia Schvartz (born March 24, 1955) is an Argentinian painter, illustrator and ceramic artist primarily known for her feminist figurative paintings.

Early life and education 
Marcia Schvartz was born March 24, 1955, in Buenos Aires. Schvartz grew up with progressive parents. Schvartz’s mother, named Hebe Clementi, was both a historian and professor. Clementi wrote extensively about indigenous culture and critiqued chattel slavery. Her father Gregorio Schvartz owned a notable bookstore. His bookstore was known for lending books to those who could not afford to buy them.

From the time she was young, Schvartz created art. In 1970 when Schvartz was 15, she began studying art at the Escuela de Bellas Artes Manuel Belgrano. Schvartz was introduced to Aída Carballo here. Carballo became an influential mentor and teacher in Schvartz’s early life. Schvartz left the Escuela de Bellas Artes Manuel Belgrano before graduating. In the 1970s, Schvartz was a member of the Peronist Youth movement. In 1976 the leftist leader Isabel Perón was overthrown in a coup. In 1979, during this time of civil unrest Schvartz self-exiled to Spain after the disappearance of her best friend in 1977. 

Schvartz’s work is heavily influenced by the disappearances during the aftermath of the coup of Isabel Peron and by the tragedies of the AIDS crisis, both of which Schvartz lost friends to. In 1983, Schvartz returned to Argentina.

Work  
Schvart’s has received recognition and has shown her work around the world (3). Schvarts has remained living in Argentina after her return in 1983. Today she teaches and paints in Buenos Aires.

Art and exhibitions 

 De Cara Al Futuro (Looking to the Future), 2010 Oil on canvas. 143x 103 cm. 
 Painting included in Schvartz’s first US retrospective. A self portrait exploring the cruelty of female aging, painted in a grotesque feminist style.
 Marcia Schvartz: Works, 1976 – 2018 Bortolami, Kaufmann Repetto, and Andrew Kreps Gallery, 55 Walker Street New York, 2021
 First US retrospective and survey of Schvartz’s work.

References

Further reading
“Marcia Schvartz Dialogó Sobre Arte Con Los Vecinos De La Villa 21-24.” Ministerio de Cultura de la Nación. Accessed October 31, 2022. https://www.cultura.gob.ar/noticias/marcia-schvartz-dialogo-sobre-arte-con-los-vecinos-de-la-villa-21-24/. 

Living people
1955 births
Wikipedia Student Program